The Syntrend Creative Park is a shopping mall in Zhongzheng District, Taipei, Taiwan.

History
The shopping mall was opened on 15 May 2015.

Name
Syntrend means three achievements in Chinese language, which consist of creativity, innovation and entrepreneurship.

Architecture
The shopping mall spans over an area of 8,100 m2 over 12 floors building.

Transportation
The shopping mall is accessible within walking distance northwest of Zhongxiao Xinsheng Station of Taipei Metro.

See also
 List of tourist attractions in Taiwan

References

External links

 

2015 establishments in Taiwan
Shopping malls established in 2015
Shopping malls in Taipei